The Big Blue, is the name of the soccer rivalry in Australia between Sydney FC and Melbourne Victory. While the main colour of both teams and their respective states are shades of the colour blue, in Australian English the word "blue" can also mean "a fight, brawl or heated argument".

Sydney and Melbourne are the two largest cities in Australia, and Sydney FC and Victory are two of the league's most supported and most successful clubs. The rivalry was further sparked by a number of highly competitive meetings between the two teams in early seasons. The Big Blue generally attracts some of the largest crowds and TV audiences of the regular season.

History

Regional rivals

There has been a long-standing rivalry between the cities of Sydney and Melbourne, the two largest cities in Australia.

In soccer terms, the rivalry has existed for almost 140 years, starting with the first inter-colonial match between Victoria and New South Wales taking place on 16 August 1883 at the East Melbourne Cricket Ground, which ended as a 2–2 draw in front of a crowd of 2,000. These intercolonial and later interstate matches continued regularly as a highlight of early Australian soccer until the outbreak of World War I. Although there were many later matches between various mostly immigrant-founded teams from Melbourne and Sydney in the Australia Cup and the National Soccer League prior to the A-League Men era, the interstate rivalry aspect was not as much of a focus, given the context and identity of the clubs involved.

Sydney FC and Melbourne Victory FC were destined to become major rivals at the inception of the A-League Men due to the historic regional rivalry between their home cities. At the time, the A-League Men operated under the "one-team, one-city" model, so the rivalry was almost instantaneous.

Significant moments  

The first competitive match between the two clubs was significantly played on the opening weekend of the inaugural 2005–06 A-League season. It was held on 28 August 2005 at Sydney FC's home ground, Sydney Football Stadium. Both teams were eager to stamp their authority as the biggest club in the league, with Sydney FC having already won the 2005 OFC Club Championship during pre-season. The match ended in a 1-all draw as Victory's first player signing and soon to become stalwart, Archie Thompson, cancelled out Sydney FC's marquee signing, Dwight Yorke's first half goal. The second meeting on 16 October 2005 resulted in a landslide win for Victory at their then home ground, Olympic Park Stadium, defeating Sydney FC 5–0. The result still stands as Sydney FC's worst defeat in this fixture.

The first encounter between the clubs during the 2006–07 A-League season (and fourth overall) entrenched the rivalry between the teams as passion and tension fueled the match. Sydney FC skipper, Mark Rudan was sent off after fourteen minutes and Victory player Fred elbowed Sydney FC defender Mark Milligan in the throat. Fred avoided sanction as he was substituted before the referee could see a replay on the big screen. The ugly incident required urgent medical attention as it left Milligan struggling to breathe and there were fears he swallowed his tongue. The following match in Melbourne, the sixth overall, set the record for attendance at an A-League match when 50,333 fans crammed into Etihad Stadium on 8 December 2006. The match ended in a nil-all draw.

After sealing the 2010 Premiership at home on the final day of the season by beating Melbourne 2–0, Sydney FC went on to win the Championship Grand Final on penalties at Melbourne's home stadium.

The rivalry reached another level in 2011, with both teams in pursuit of the signature of Socceroo Harry Kewell pre-season. Melbourne Victory announced they had signed Kewell on 20 August and five days afterwards Sydney FC announced that they had signed Socceroo Brett Emerton from Blackburn Rovers. The teams played out a 0–0 stalemate in the first round of the 2011–12 A-League season, with Australia's head coach not picking either player for national duty, allowing the eagerly-anticipated match up to occur.

A Big Blue match has been played each Australia Day at either the Melbourne Rectangular Stadium or Docklands Stadium in Melbourne since the 2011–12 A-League season which ended in a 2–all draw. However, the 2014–15 A-League season did not feature this fixture due to the 2015 AFC Asian Cup.

Since 2012, the teams have played for the BeyondBlue Cup, which is awarded to the winning team in the Big Blue. Sydney FC claimed the inaugural BeyondBlue Cup by defeating Melbourne Victory 1–0 at Allianz Stadium on 10 March 2012.

On 10 November 2012, Melbourne Victory came from 2–0 down to win 3–2 at Allianz Stadium, with two late goals from substitute player Andrew Nabbout helping them achieve the result. This match turned out of be Ian Crook's last match as Sydney FC manager, as he announced his resignation shortly after the defeat, which was Sydney's fourth in six games.

The fixture played 8 December 2006 holds the record for the second highest attendance at a regular season match with 50,333 in attendance. Currently, three fixtures between the two sides make up the top ten of the League's highest regular season attendances.

With Sydney defeating Melbourne on 3 March 2017 (36th match), they became the first side to win all 3 games of the rivalry in the normal season.

Melbourne Victory and Sydney met in the 2017 A-League Grand Final. Despite Sydney only losing 1 game throughout the whole season, it was Melbourne Victory who took the lead through a Besart Berisha goal. Sydney FC equalised after halftime thanks to Rhyan Grant. The game went to penalties and Sydney won 4–2 on penalties. It was exactly the same scoreline as there meeting in the 2010 Grand Final.

Head-to-head summary

All-time results

Regular season matches

Finals series matches

Leading goalscorers (4+ goals)

 BOLD indicates player still playing for that club.

Players who played for both clubs

 Players in bold denote currently still active at either Melbourne Victory or Sydney FC

Played for one, managed the other

See also 
Soccer in Australia
List of association football club rivalries by country

References 

Australian soccer rivalries
Melbourne Victory FC
Sydney FC
Soccer in Melbourne
Soccer in Sydney